Phaius philippinensis is a species of orchid in the genus Phaius that was described by N. E. Brown in 1889. It is endemic to the Philippines.

References

philippinensis
Plants described in 1889
Orchids of the Philippines